The Photographer of Mauthausen is a 2018 Spanish biography drama historical film directed by  starring Mario Casas, Macarena Gómez, and Alain Hernández. The film tells the history of the photographer Francisco Boix during his life in the Mauthausen-Gusen concentration camp complex.

Actor Mario Casas lost 12 kg in weight while preparing to play the part of the malnourished Boix.

Plot 
Based on the true story of Spanish Civil War veteran Francisco Boix, a prisoner at Nazi German Mauthausen concentration camp, who preserved and hid photographs of the conditions at camp. Boix and his fellow prisoners risked their lives to save negatives and evidence of the atrocities committed at Mauthausen.

Cast

Production 
The film is a Rodar y Rodar, We Produce 2017 AIE and Filmteam production, and it had the participation/collaboration of RTVE, TV3, ICCA, ICEC, and Netflix.

Release 
Distributed by Filmax, the film was theatrically released in Spain on 26 October 2018.

Accolades 

|-
| rowspan = "4" | 2019 || rowspan = "4" | 33rd Goya Awards || Best Makeup and Hairstyles || Caitlin Acheson, Jesús Martos, Pablo Perona ||  || rowspan = "4" | 
|-
| Best Production Supervision || Eduard Vallès, Hanga Kurucz || 
|-
| Best Art Direction || Rosa Ros || 
|-
| Best Costume Design || Mercè Paloma || 
|}

See also 
 List of Spanish films of 2018

References

External links
 

Spanish biographical drama films
2018 biographical drama films
Spanish historical drama films
2010s historical drama films
Films shot in Budapest
RTVE
Televisió de Catalunya
2018 drama films
Rodar y Rodar films
2010s Spanish-language films
2010s Spanish films